Riverfront Stadium is a baseball park in downtown Wichita, Kansas, United States. It serves as the home ballpark of the Wichita Wind Surge of the Texas League. The team relocated from the New Orleans suburb of Metairie, Louisiana, after the 2019 season.

Riverfront Stadium has a total seating capacity of 10,025 people with 6,000 in fixed seating in addition to luxury suites and a grass berm in right field. When not used for baseball, the city plans to use the facility for sports festivals, high school football, concerts, and an ice rink in winter. The new ballpark will share hosting of the National Baseball Congress World Series (NBC World Series) with Eck Stadium at Wichita State.

History

Previous stadiums
Island Park baseball stadium was built in 1912 on what was then Ackerman Island in the Arkansas River, north of the Douglas Street bridge. Baseball was played there from 1912 to 1933, when the stadium was torn down so the island could be removed to widen the river into one channel.

Lawrence Stadium was built on the site of the current stadium in 1934 as a Works Progress Administration (WPA) project during the Great Depression. In 1978, it was renamed to Lawrence–Dumont Stadium. In November 2018, the stadium was demolished to make room for the new Riverfront Stadium. The National Baseball Congress World Series was played entirely at Lawrence–Dumont Stadium from 1935 until 2018.

Current stadium
Riverfront Stadium was built on the site of the former Lawrence–Dumont Stadium. Ground was broken for the ballpark in February 2019. A topping out ceremony, marking the placement of the last steel beam, was held on August 7, 2019. The stadium name was announced on March 6, 2020.

The ballpark was built to host the Wichita Wind Surge, a Triple-A team of the Pacific Coast League. However, a combination of the cancellation of the 2020 season due to the COVID-19 pandemic and Major League Baseball's realignment of the minor leagues for 2021, resulted in the team dropping down to the Double-A Texas League without having played a Triple-A game.

On April 10, 2021, the Wichita State Shockers  baseball team hosted the University of Houston in the first game played at Riverfront Stadium.

References

External links
 City of Wichita Stadium Project

2019 establishments in Kansas
Baseball venues in Kansas
Sports venues in Wichita, Kansas
Texas League ballparks